Frank Lee (4 Oct 1880 - 1949) was an English professional rugby league footballer who played in the 1900s and 1910s.

International honours
Frank Lee won a cap for England while at St. Helens in 1906 against Other Nationalities.

References

External links
Profile at saints.org.uk

Search for "Frank" at rugbyleagueproject.org
Search for "Lee" at rugbyleagueproject.org

1880 births
1949 deaths
England national rugby league team players
English rugby league players
Lancashire rugby league team players
Place of death missing
Rugby league forwards
Rugby league fullbacks
Rugby league players from St Helens, Merseyside
St Helens R.F.C. players
York Wasps players